Palaquium impressionervium is a species of plant in the family Sapotaceae. It is found in Malaysia and Thailand. It is threatened by habitat loss.

References

impressionervium
Flora of Malaya
Flora of Thailand
Taxonomy articles created by Polbot
Taxobox binomials not recognized by IUCN